Xinji may refer to the following locations in China:

 Xinji (辛集市), city in Hebei

Towns 
Written as "新集镇":
 Xinji, Fengtai County, Anhui
 Xinji, Wuhe County, Anhui
 Xinji, Yingshang County, Anhui
 Xinji, Linxia County, Gansu
 Xinji, Changli County, Hebei
 Xinji, Sanhe, Hebei
 Xinji, Tangshan, in Qianxi County, Hebei
 Xinji, Xin County, Henan
 Xinji, Yizheng, Jiangsu
 Xinji, Shaanxi, in Nanzheng County

Written as "辛集镇":
 Xinji, Haixing County, Hebei
 Xinji, Xinji, Hebei
 Xinji, Luyi County, Henan
 Xinji, Yinan County, Shandong

Townships 
Written as "新集乡":
 Xinji Township, Dingxi, in Anding District, Dingxi, Gansu
 Xinji Township, Zhenyuan County, Gansu
 Xinji Township, Tongbai County, Henan
 Xinji Township, Guannan County, Jiangsu
 Xinji Township, Ningxia, in Pengyang County

Written as "辛集乡":
 Xinji Township, Lushan County, Henan
 Xinji Township, Guan County, Shandong